Made in Bangladesh is a merchandise mark indicating that a product has been manufactured in Bangladesh.

History
Bangladesh is one of the largest manufacturers and exporters of ready-made garments in the world.

See also 
 Country of origin

References 

Bangladesh
Economy of Bangladesh
Manufacturing in Bangladesh